A rhoptron ((), plural: rhoptra) was a buzzing drum used in Ancient Greece associated with the Corybantes. According to Plutarch, it made a frightening sound, resembling a mix of animal noises and lightning, and was used by the Parthians to scare their opponents in battle instead of the more typical Greek battlefield instruments, the salpinx or horn.

According to Plutarch, a rhoptron was made from hollowed-out piece of pine or fir that had only one opening (stoma), unlike a frame drum, which were also used by the Greeks. This piece was somehow fitted with bronze bells (kōdōnes) and covered with oxhide, so that the bells collided with the head as it was played. In this way it resembles a snare drum more than a tambourine, though the latter is often used in translation. The rhoptra were played with the fingers, not sticks.

Rhoptra were also known as rhombos, which also designated a bullroarer. Among the Ancient Greeks it also meant a door knocker, a meaning it retains in the modern language.

See also
 Parthian music

Notes

References
 
 Thomas J. Mathiesen. Apollo's Lyre: Greek Music and Music Theory in Antiquity and the Middle Ages. Lincoln: University of Nebraska Press, 1999. Pages 173-176.

Hand drums
Ancient Greek musical instruments
Parthian Empire